Sir Reginald Stephen Garfield Todd (13 July 1908 – 13 October 2002) was a liberal Prime Minister of Southern Rhodesia from 1953 to 1958 and later became an opponent of white minority rule in Rhodesia.

Background
Todd was born in Invercargill, New Zealand, in 1908. He was educated at Otago University, Glen Leith Theological College, and the University of the Witwatersrand. In 1932 he married Jean Grace Wilson, with whom he had three daughters. 
 
Todd emigrated to Southern Rhodesia from New Zealand in 1934 as a Protestant missionary and ran the Dadaya New Zealand Churches of Christ Mission school. One of the primary-school teachers in his charge was Robert Mugabe. Though he had no formal medical training, Todd and his wife, Grace, set up a clinic where he delivered hundreds of babies and treated minor injuries. His ranch, Hokonui, was named after the hills in his home province of Southland.

Political involvement
In 1948 Todd won election to parliament. He succeeded Sir Godfrey Martin Huggins as leader of the United Rhodesia Party and Prime Minister of Southern Rhodesia in 1953 when Huggins became the inaugural Prime Minister of the newly established Federation of Rhodesia and Nyasaland in 1953. At the same time the United Rhodesia Party became the United Federal Party.

From 1955 to 1960 Todd served as first vice-president of the World Convention of Churches of Christ.

Government

Todd introduced modest reforms aimed at improving the education of the black majority by taking tax-money paid by Rhodesian property owners and appropriations from the British colonial authorities, and directing it toward black schools. His government introduced a plan to give elementary education to every African of school age. He doubled the number of primary schools and gave grants to missionary-run schools to introduce secondary school and pre-university courses for blacks.

He also introduced the appellation "Mr" for blacks instead of "AM" ("African Male") and ended the prohibition on the sale of alcohol to black residents of the reserves, who were allowed to drink European beer and wine, though not spirits.

Todd pushed a bill through the Legislative Assembly, allowing for multiracial trade unions, thereby undercutting the growing white nationalist influence in the unions. Lastly, in a bid to increase the number of blacks eligible to vote from 2% to 16% of the electorate, he moved to lower property and education qualifications, but this was rejected.  
 
In response, Todd's ministers resigned en bloc, and following the appointment of a new cabinet, his party forced him out of power; three months later he was replaced as party leader and Prime Minister by Edgar Whitehead.

In a farewell statement, he said "We must make it possible for every individual to lead the good life, to win a place in the sun. We are in danger of becoming a race of fear-ridden neurotics – we who live in the finest country on Earth."

In addition to prime ministership, Todd was Minister of Finance and several other portfolios. He was granted retention of the title The Honourable in October 1958, for having served more than three years on the executive council.

Later life
After helping to co-ordinate the isolation and embargo of Rhodesia, and especially after his support for legitimising guerrilla activity by black nationalists, Todd was widely condemned as a traitor by white Rhodesians. When the Smith Government was ultimately forced to give up power and the nation became the independent state of Zimbabwe in 1980, Todd was immediately considered for appointment to the new black government for his "collaborating" role. Lord Soames, following the recommendation of Prime Minister-elect Robert Mugabe, appointed Todd to the Senate on 8 April 1980, where Todd served until his retirement in 1985. After years of supporting Mugabe, Todd became disillusioned with the new regime due to its blatant violence against political opponents. He was appointed a Knight Bachelor, for services to Africa and New Zealand, by Queen Elizabeth II in the 1986 New Year Honours, at the instigation of the New Zealand government.

During retirement, Todd donated  of his ranch to former guerillas who had been maimed in the Rhodesian Bush War. Nonetheless, Todd's criticism of Mugabe intensified and in 2002 he was stripped of Zimbabwean nationality. He died, aged 94, on 13 October 2002, in Bulawayo.

Notes

External links
Sir Garfield Todd – Liberal Rhodesian premier brought down over black reforms, The Guardian, 14 October 2002 
Mugabe was rotten from the start Interview with Judith Todd discussing her political activities in Zimbabwe and her father, The Sunday Times, 23 September 2007
Interview on New Zealand television, 13 January 1980

|-

|-

1908 births
2002 deaths
People from Invercargill
New Zealand Protestant missionaries
University of the Witwatersrand alumni
Prime Ministers of Rhodesia
Finance ministers of Rhodesia
Rhodesian politicians
Zimbabwean people of English descent
Members of the Legislative Assembly of Southern Rhodesia
Members of the Senate of Zimbabwe
Knights Bachelor
New Zealand emigrants to Zimbabwe
Protestant missionaries in Zimbabwe
Rhodesian Congregationalists
United Federal Party politicians
Zimbabwe African People's Union politicians
Politicians awarded knighthoods